Credell Calhoun (born May 20, 1943) is an American businessman and Democratic politician. He served as a member of the Mississippi House of Representatives from the 68th District from 2003 to 2020. Calhoun decided not to run for reelection in 2019.

References

1943 births
Living people
People from Natchitoches, Louisiana
Democratic Party members of the Mississippi House of Representatives
African-American state legislators in Mississippi
21st-century American politicians
21st-century African-American politicians
20th-century African-American people